Mitcham is a town in the London Borough of Merton, London, England.

Mitcham may also refer to:

Places 
Mitcham (UK Parliament constituency), comprising Mitcham, Wallington and Beddington suburbs of South London
Mitcham, New Zealand, a locality in the Ashburton District
Mitcham, South Australia, a suburb of Adelaide in South Australia
The City of Mitcham, local council area in South Australia 
Mitcham, Victoria, a suburb of Melbourne, Victoria, Australia
Electoral district of Mitcham (Victoria), an electoral district in Victoria, Australia
Electoral district of Mitcham (South Australia)

Surname 
Carl Mitcham (born 1941), an American philosopher of technology
Gene Mitcham (1932–2008), an American football player
Howard Mitcham (1917–1996), an American artist, poet, and cook
Judson Mitcham (born 1948), an American author and poet 
Matthew Mitcham (born 1988), an Australian Olympic gold medalist in diving
Rio Mitcham (born 1999), a British sprinter
Samuel W. Mitcham (born 1949), an American author and military historian
Wilbur Mitcham (1923–2003), an American chef

See also 
Michtam (disambiguation)
Mitchum (surname)